Robin Spriggs (born April 1, 1974) is an American writer, actor, and poet. Known primarily as a dark fabulist, he is the author of the critically acclaimed The Untold Tales of Ozman Droom, Diary of a Gentleman Diabolist, and Wondrous Strange: Tales of the Uncanny. He is the co-author of The Dracula Poems: A Poetic Encounter with the Lord of Vampires and the creator of Capes & Cowls: Adventures in Wyrd City, a "book-in-a-box" superhero board game based on his illustrated series, Capes & Cowls: The Wyrd City Chronicles.

Overview 
Spriggs holds degrees in both English and Theatre. He has been nominated for a Pushcart Prize, a Bram Stoker Award, a Rhysling Award, and received honorable mention in The Year’s Best Fantasy and Horror. His fiction and poetry have appeared in such publications as Beyond, The Rhysling Anthology, Cemetery Dance, Going Postal, Space & Time, Terminal Fright, A Season in Carcosa, and the Shirley Jackson Award-winning anthology The Grimscribe's Puppets.

The literary offerings of Robin Spriggs have been well received by critics. Publishers Weekly, in its review of The Untold Tales of Ozman Droom, observed, "Spriggs evokes terror and awe," and "Medium is the message in this dazzling anti-story, a love letter to the weird."

Rue Morgue declared The Untold Tales of Ozman Droom "A hard-to-describe yet highly entertaining compilation . . . an experience weird fiction fans should not pass up."

According to Cemetery Dance magazine, "Spriggs displays a wide range of talents in both form and substance. He's equally comfortable in the short story, short-short and novella lengths. His tone varies from the gently whimsical to the truly nasty. He crosses genre lines with ease, showing strength in all forms of the fantastic, from horror to fantasy to science fiction."

His lyrical prose, with its dreamlike and often frightening depiction of reality, has been compared to the work of such writers as Edgar Allan Poe, Robert Walser, Ray Bradbury, Jorge Luis Borges, Robert Aickman, Flannery O'Connor, and Lord Dunsany. Much of Spriggs's work, in fact, falls into the category of prose poetry, prompting thriller author Harry Shannon to refer to him as "a linguistic acrobat who works without a net."

Noted editor and anthologist Ellen Datlow, in volume 3 of her The Best Horror of the Year, wrote: "Diary of a Gentleman Diabolist by Robin Spriggs is a series of well-wrought interconnected prose poems of the ghostly and uncanny."<ref>Best Horror of the Year, Volume 3, (Nightshade Books)</ref> Internationally distributed fan magazine Fangoria referred to the same collection as "a rather ingenious little grimoire charting—in fractured, dreamlike form—the trip of a seeker, someone who dives head first into the fevered realms of black magic and beyond, encountering all manner of arcane horror and supernatural phenomena."

Due to the cult popularity of his aforementioned Dracula Poems, the long out-of-print book often commands inordinately high prices.

As an actor, Spriggs is best known for his portrayal of Morrison, aka The Ghost, on the second season of PlayStation Network's superhero crime series, Powers, based on the comic book by Brian Michael Bendis and Michael Avon Oeming. Spriggs has also appeared as Captain Franco in the NBC science-fiction series Revolution, created by Eric Kripke and produced by J. J. Abrams, as Chris Amante in the USA Network drama series Necessary Roughness, and as Harley in The CW TV miniseries Containment. His performance in the rural noir Sinkhole was called "terrific" by Variety .

 Bibliography 
Partial list: 
 The Dracula Poems: A Poetic Encounter with the Lord of Vampires (1992)
 Wondrous Strange: Tales of the Uncanny (2001)
 Capes & Cowls: Adventures in Wyrd City (2006)
 Diary of a Gentleman Diabolist (2010)
 The Untold Tales of Ozman Droom'' (2014)

References

External links
 

 Robin Spriggs at Hollywood Reporter
 Robin Spriggs's Wondrous Strange on Internet Book List

House of Nine - Fan site dedicated to Robin Spriggs
Interview with Robin Spriggs at Read Horror

Living people
American short story writers
American male poets
American fantasy writers
American horror writers
American male film actors
American occultists
1974 births
American male novelists
American male short story writers
21st-century American poets
21st-century American male writers